Khali and similar can mean:
An empty beat indicating the beginning of a subdivision in the taal rhythmic cycle
Khali, Jajarkot, a village in Jajarkot district of Karnali province of Nepal
The Great Khali, an Indian professional wrestler, actor, and former powerlifter
Rub' al Khali, a large desert in Arabia
Simbi Khali, born April 28, 1971, an American actress
Nira Khali, a fictional character from the Saga of Seven Suns series of novels by Kevin J. Anderson
Ksar el Khali, a town in central-northern Mauritania

See also
 Kali (disambiguation)
 Khalistan